Karan Goel is a cricket player from Punjab who has represented Punjab in Ranji Trophy matches. Born in Ludhiana, Punjab (India), Karan Goel made his first-class debut with his state side during the 2005-06 Ranji Trophy season. He was offered an IPL contract by the Kings XI Punjab in 2008, for whom he played the next two seasons.

However, he was not consistent and did not play again in the cash-rich league. He did not play domestic cricket after the 2012–13 season.

References

Indian cricketers
Punjab, India cricketers
Punjabi people
Cricketers from Ludhiana
1986 births
Living people
Punjab Kings cricketers
North Zone cricketers
India Red cricketers